Pirates is the eighth studio album by Austrian symphonic metal band Visions of Atlantis, released by Napalm Records on 13 May 2022.

Reception 
The album received mostly positive reviews. 
Blabbermouth.net said the album "Pirates begins with a wonderful showcase for the whole band's talents. Modestly epic but blessed with a lethal chorus, it designates the sweet spot where Visions of Atlantis feel most potent: big tunes, plenty of bombast and grandeur and occasional hints of something deeper and more atmospheric shimmering away at the fringes", giving the album an 8 out of 10.
The Metal Protocol stated "Pirates certainly puts their vocals to maximum use. A number of the songs put the vocals front and center, with the band largely sitting in the background. Not a bad thing on those ballads and signature moments with the use of 2 ultra talented vocalists up front", giving the album an 8.5 out of 10. 	
Metal-Rules said of the album, "Melody is the foundation these tunes are built upon, and the album flows naturally and logically from track to track like scenes from a movie. There are moments of sheer headbanging glory complete with anthemic hook laden sing-along choruses followed by sense-tingling melancholic moody passages", giving the album a perfect 5 out of 5.

Track listing

Personnel 
	

	

	
Band members
	
Clémentine Delauney – lead vocals, backing vocals
	
Michele Guaitoli – lead vocals, backing vocals
	
Christian Douscha – guitars
	
Herbert Glos – bass guitars
	
Thomas Caser – drums

Charts

References

External links
	
Pirates by Visions of Atlantis on Discogs
	

	

Visions of Atlantis albums
2022 albums